Going Ape! is a 1981 American comedy film directed by Jeremy Joe Kronsberg and produced by Paramount Pictures. The original music score was composed by Elmer Bernstein (who would later compose music for a later similarly ape-themed comedy Buddy). This film starred Tony Danza as Foster, Stacey Nelkin as Cynthia, Jessica Walter as Fiona, Danny DeVito as Lazlo, and three orangutans. 

In this comedy, the death of his rich circus performer father leaves Foster as the sole heir to a five million dollar estate—if he can keep his three pet orangutans safe and sound for the next two years. With the help of his disgruntled girlfriend Cynthia and the apes' eccentric handler Lazlo, Foster must struggle to keep the outrageous primates out of trouble and away from a trio of bungling hitmen.

Plot
Struggling slacker Foster Sabatini is the only member of his circus family who left the life, greatly disappointing his wealthy father Max Sabatini (of The Flying Sabatinis). When Max dies, Foster and his sisters (who all hate Foster) are shocked to hear that Max left his entire estate to Foster, but only on the condition that Foster can care for his father's beloved trio of orangutans. Along with the orangutans, Foster also inherits the services of Lazlo - Max's manservant & protege. The arrival of the orangutans and Lazlo turn Foster's life upside-down, all while he attempts to win back his disgruntled girlfriend and impress her high-society mother. All during the film are non-stop instances where the apes wreak havoc on Foster's quiet and simple life with their crazy and outrageous antics, while Lazlo continuously recites many quotations from Max (always ending with "Love Max").

Things are further complicated by a trio of bungling assassins hired by the local zoological society, who will inherit both the money and the orangutans if one of the apes dies. In scenes reminiscent of the Three Stooges, each attempt by the hitmen is foiled by the apes and results in the hitmen injuring themselves instead. Foster and the others are completely unaware of the attempts on the apes (until the end, when the frustrated hitmen barge in and take the apes by force), and try to keep order despite the mischievous behavior of the orangutans.

Once aware of the danger to the apes, Foster and his friends must save the newly accepted primates from their captors and bring the assassins to justice.

Main cast

Awards
The film was nominated for a Razzie Award for Worst Supporting Actor for DeVito.

Home video
The film was released on VHS in the 1980s however was never released on DVD and remained out of print on home video for many years until it was released in January 2022 on Blu-ray.

References

External links
 
 
 

1981 films
1981 romantic comedy films
American crime comedy films
American romantic comedy films
1980s English-language films
Films scored by Elmer Bernstein
Films set in San Diego
Paramount Pictures films
Films about apes
1980s American films